Consolation Marriage is a 1931 American Pre-Code drama film directed by Paul Sloane and written by Humphrey Pearson. The film stars Irene Dunne, Pat O'Brien, John Halliday, Myrna Loy, and Matt Moore. The film was released on November 21, 1931, by RKO Pictures.

Plot
In prohibition-era Manhattan, shopkeeper Mary Brown loses Aubrey, her childhood sweetheart, when he marries a rich woman. Reporter Steve "Rollo" Porter has also lost his childhood sweetheart, Elaine, who has married some one else. Mary and Steve become friends and make a marriage of convenience based on a shared sense of whimsical humor as well as their mutual losses. When their old loves re-enter their lives, a few years later, Mary and Steve must decide what is really important to them.

Cast
Irene Dunne as Mary Brown Porter
Pat O'Brien as Steve Porter
John Halliday as Jeff Hunter
Myrna Loy as Elaine Brandon
Matt Moore as the Colonel
Lester Vail as Aubrey
Elmer Ballard as Undetermined Role (uncredited)
Wilson Benge as Elaine's Butler (uncredited)
Edgar Dearing as Mulligan, a Policeman (uncredited)
Wild Bill Elliott as Dog Show Attendee (uncredited)
Tom Herbert as Dog Owner (uncredited)
Robert Homans as Justice of the Peace (uncredited)
Gertrude Howard as Kate, Mary's Maid (uncredited)
Gladden James as Charlie, Newspaper Worker and One of the Boys (uncredited)
Frank McLure as Celebrant in Ship's Cabin (uncredited)
Dave O'Brien as Man Picking Up Stack of Newspapers (uncredited)
Ronald R. Rondell as Dog Show Attendee (uncredited)
Pauline Stevens as Baby Porter (uncredited)

References

External links

1931 films
American black-and-white films
RKO Pictures films
1931 drama films
American drama films
Films directed by Paul Sloane
1930s English-language films
1930s American films